Doctor Who – Battles in Time was a fortnightly magazine and card game based on the British television series Doctor Who.

Test series issues 
 Daleks: Dealers of Death!
 Slitheen: Mean and Green!
 Sycorax: Scavenging Slave Masters!
 Alien Guests: At the End Of the World!
 K-9: Heroic Hound!
 Cyberman: Steely Killers!
 Krillitanes: Bat Creatures!

Issues 
There are 70 issues in total. GE Fabbri have stopped Battles In Time to continue with their new Doctor Who DVD Files project.

 Daleks: Dealers of death!
 Cybermen: Steely Killers!
 Krillitanes: Bat Creatures!
 Slitheen: Mean and Green!
 K-9: Heroic Hound!
 Alien Guests: At the End Of the World!
 Sycorax: Scavenging Slave Masters!
 Ood: Slaves of the Beast!
 Cult of Skaro!
 Cat Nurses: Medical Menaces!
 Clockwork Robots: Automatic Assassins!
 Cyberman Cyber Leader: Ghostly Invader!
 The Beast: Pure Burning Evil!
 Werewolf: Howling Horror!
 Autons: Plastic Power!
 Racnoss Empress: Sinister Spider!
 Cassandra: The Many Faces of Evil!
 Empty Child: Are You My Mummy?
 Judoon: Rampaging Rhinos!
 Game Station: Killer Television Shows!
 Carrionites: Evil Enchantments!
 Abzorbaloff: Grotesque Green Giant!
 Dalek Sec: Human Monster!
 Macra: Car-crushing Crabs
 Jagrafess: Deep-Freeze Demon!
 Sun-Possessed: Burn With Them!
 Lazarus: Genetic Mutation!
 The Wire: Television Terror!
 The Master: Rogue Time Lord
 Family of Blood!
 Weeping Angels!
 Reapers: Vortex Vultures!
 The Face of Boe!
 Toclafane: Slicing Spheres!
 The Final Experiment!
 Scarecrows: Straw Soldiers!
 Dalek Emperor: The God of All Daleks!
 The Graske: Body Snatchers!
 Time Lords: Gallifreyan Gods
 Max Capricorn and the Heavenly Hosts
 The Gelth Gaslight Ghosts!
 Zygons: Shape-Shifters!
 Dalek Mutations!
 Planet of the Ood!
 Sontarans: Clone Warriors!
 Vervoids: Killer Plants
 The Hath: Bubbling Race!
 Adipose: Blubber Babies
 Pyrovile: Magma Monsters
 The Axons: Family of Terror
 Vespiform: Giant Killer Wasp
 Davros: Dalek Creator
 Shadow Proclamation
 Supreme Dalek and Dalek Caan
 Vashta Nerada: Killer Shadows
 Sybilline Sisterhood
 Trickster's Brigade
 CAL: Virtual Terror!
 Titanic: Fight for Survival!
 Companions: Children of Time
 Cybershades: Servants of Steel
 The Gorgon: Ancient Terror!
 Odd Bob: Child Stealer
 Slitheen: Revenge is Green!
 Kudlak: War Criminal
 Ancient Haemovore
 The Trickster: Time-twisting terror!
 CyberKing: Majestic Might!
 Sontarans: Thirst for Revenge!
 Monsters! Feel the fear!

Special issues 
 SP1. Daleks Vs. Cybermen: Published 16 May 2007. Came With A Special Daleks & Cybermen 18-Card Bonus Set, Exclusive Game Accessories And A TARDIS Deck Tin.
 SP2. Invader Special: Published 2007. Came With two Packs Of Invader Cards, The Special "Dalek Blaster" Card And A Battles In Time Card Folder.
 SP3. Ultimate Monsters Special: Published 5 March 2008. Came With Four Packs Of Ultimate Monsters Cards.
 SP4. Devestator Special: Published 2008. Came With Four Packs Of Devestator Cards And A Poster / Checklist Containing A List Of All 250 Cards.
 TSP. Torchwood Collection: A Small Pamphlet Was Given Free Advertising And Describing The Torchwood Card Collection From GE Fabbri; This Is Considered A Special Issue.

Battles in Time
Battles in Time
Collectible card games
Lists of magazine issues